James Webb Throckmorton (February 1, 1825April 21, 1894) was an American politician who served as the 12th governor of Texas from 1866 to 1867 during the early days of Reconstruction. He was a United States Congressman from Texas from 1875 to 1879 and again from 1883 to 1889.

Biography
Following the outbreak of a Mexican–American War, he joined the 1st Texas Volunteers as a private in February 1847. A few months later, he was assigned as an assistant surgeon to the Texas Rangers, until receiving a medical discharge in June of that year. During the Texas secession convention in 1861, he was one of only eight delegates to vote against secession from the United States. Despite this, he served in the Confederate Army, first as a captain of Company K, 6th Texas Cavalry Regiment.

He was promoted to brigadier general by 1862. During late 1862 while stationed in North Texas, which was chaotic because of military and state militia abuses, he saved all but five men in Sherman, Texas, from being lynched by militia as suspects in anticonscription activities. Violent acts had spread in North Texas after the Great Hanging at Gainesville earlier in October 1862, when a total of 42 men were killed, most hanged.

Throckmorton defeated Elisha M. Pease in the Texas gubernatorial election of June 25, 1866, at the same time that the legislature approved a new constitution. During his term as governor, Throckmorton's lenient attitude toward former Confederates and his attitude toward civil rights conflicted with the Reconstruction politics of the Radical Republicans in Congress. He angered the local military commander, Major General Charles Griffin, who persuaded his superior, Philip H. Sheridan, to remove Throckmorton from office and replace him with Elisha M. Pease, an appointed Republican and Unionist.

As the Radical Republican's influence began to wane in the mid-1870s, Throckmorton was elected to Congress representing Texas's 3rd Congressional District. He later served the 5th District in the 1880s.

Throckmorton died at age 69 from a fall, having become frail due to kidney disease.

References

Further reading

External links
 James Webb Throckmorton - McKinney’s Courthouse Statue by Tricia Haas.

|-

1825 births
1894 deaths
Democratic Party governors of Texas
Democratic Party Texas state senators
Democratic Party members of the United States House of Representatives from Texas
19th-century American politicians